Amagami SS is a 2010 anime series based on the PS2 Dating sim Amagami. The series follows Junichi Tachibana, a second year high school student from Kibitou High who dislikes celebrating Christmas due to a past incident two years ago when his date stood him up on Christmas Eve which left him heartbroken. However, this Christmas will be different as his encounter with one of these six girls, Haruka Morishima, Kaoru Tanamachi, Sae Nakata, Ai Nanasaki, Rihoko Sakurai and Tsukasa Ayatsuji will finally open up his heart to love again. The anime adaptation is rather unusual as it is divided into several story arcs where each arc focuses on one of the main heroines who will become Junichi's love interest. Two extra episodes which features Risa Kamizaki and Miya Tachibana as the heroines was released on the 13th anime Blu-ray/DVD on April 29, 2011  along with two Short Side-Story OVAs for those who order the first 12 Blu-ray/DVDs. On August 13, 2011, a second season of Amagami SS was announced. The second season, titled Amagami SS+ plus, aired on January 5, 2012 to March 29, 2012.

The anime is produced by AIC and directed and series composition by Yoshimasa Hiraike, scripted by Noboru Kimura and Touko Machida, music by Toshiyuki Omori, character design by Hiroaki Gohda and art and sound direction by Maho Takahashi and Satoki Iida respectively. The anime is also licensed and released in North America by Sentai Filmworks.

Theme song
Amagami SS uses several theme songs:
The first opening theme, "i Love" by azusa, ran from episode 1 to 12 and was released on July 21, 2010.
The second opening theme,  by azusa, ran from episode 13 to 26 and was released on October 20, 2010. The ending theme songs varies from arc to arc.

Episode list

Amagami SS (2010)

OVAs (2011)

Amagami SS+ plus (2012)

OVAs (2012)

References

General

Notes

External links
  Official Game Website
  Official Anime Website

Amagami SS

zh:聖誕之吻#電視動畫